Kevin Vogt (born 23 September 1991) is a German professional footballer who plays as a centre back and midfielder for Bundesliga club 1899 Hoffenheim.

Club career
At the age of 3, Vogt started playing football at VfB Langendreerholz, a local club in Bochum. There, he stayed until 2002 when becoming old enough to play in the 'D-Jugend' (in Germany the playing level for 11-to-13-year-old youths) and joined WSV Bochum. In 2004, he was able to take the next step when he was spotted by local heavyweight VfL Bochum and signed a youth contract with them. There he ran through all the youth ranks and eventually signed a professional contract on 16 December 2008.

He played his first Bundesliga match for VfL Bochum, and first fully professional game, on 18 April 2009 in a 0–2 loss against Borussia Dortmund. Vogt was substituted on in the 84th minute for Christoph Dabrowski. But this remained his only Bundesliga game for Bochum. During the following 2009–10 season Vogt only was capped for the second team, playing in fourth tier Regionalliga and the first team was relegated into the 2. Bundesliga at the end of the season. There Vogt became a regular for the next two years before joining newly promoted Bundesliga side FC Augsburg in Summer 2012. Augsburg paid a transfer fee of a reported €700,000.

On 26 May 2014, it was announced that Vogt would join Köln and sign a contract expiring 2017. The transfer fee amounts allegedly €1.5 million.

On 30 May 2016, Hoffenheim announced the signing of Vogt.

On 12 January 2020, Vogt was loaned out to Werder Bremen until the end of the season.

International career
From 2008 to 2013, Vogt was a member of several German national youth football teams. He played his first game on 17 December 2008 against Israel U18.

Career statistics

References

External links
 

Living people
1991 births
Association football defenders
Association football midfielders
German footballers
FC Augsburg players
VfL Bochum players
VfL Bochum II players
1. FC Köln players
TSG 1899 Hoffenheim players
SV Werder Bremen players
Bundesliga players
2. Bundesliga players
Regionalliga players
Germany under-21 international footballers
Germany youth international footballers
People from Witten
Sportspeople from Arnsberg (region)
Footballers from North Rhine-Westphalia